The Presbyterian Church of Mauritius emerged from the Church of Scotland's and the Independent church of Mauritius' discussion with the help of the Rev Jean Le Brun in 1814, they created a single congregation. Now it consists of 4 French speaking and 1 English speaking congregations ( St. Columba in Phoenix). These are the St. André in, St. Columba, St. Jean, St. Joseph and St. Pierre parishes throughout the island. The churches located in Rose Hill, Mauritius, Grand Gaube, Pointe-aux-Piments, Phoenix, Mauritius and Port Louis, Mauritius. It has presbyterian church government with parish council, synodal council and Synod and subscribes the Westminster Confession of Faith. The Synod meets annually. Each parish choose its own elders. Baptism and Lords Supper is the recognised Sacraments. Total membership is approximately 800-900.

It is a member of the World Communion of Reformed Churches.

References

External links 
Presbyterian Church of Mauritius

Presbyterian denominations in Africa
Members of the World Communion of Reformed Churches